Gyulagarak (also Romanized as Gyulagorak; formerly, Gyulabarrak) is a village in the Lori Province of Armenia.

Gyulagarak is near the Stepanavan Dendropark.

Notable people
Hrant Shahinyan, two-time Olympic and World champion in gymnastics

See also

Towns nearby
 Stepanavan

Villages nearby
 Gargar
 Hobardzi
 Vardablur
 Amrakits
 Lori Berd

References

World Gazeteer: Armenia – World-Gazetteer.com

Populated places in Lori Province